Reed is a town in Desha County, Arkansas, United States. The population was 141 at the 2010 census.

Geography
Reed is located at  (33.701930, -91.443851).

Government

The mayor of Reed is George Barnes. The first mayor was Moses William Johnson.

Demographics

As of the census of 2000, there were 275 people, 95 households, and 72 families residing in the town. The population density was 2,668.5 inhabitants per square mile (1,061.8/km). The racial makeup of the town was 0.73% White, 96.36% Black or African American, 0.36% Native American, 0.73% from other races, and 1.82% from two or more races.  1.09% of the population were Hispanic or Latino of any race.

There were 95 households, out of which 41.1% had children under the age of 18 living with them, 31.6% were married couples living together, 40.0% had a female householder with no husband present, and 23.2% were non-families. 21.1% of all households were made up of individuals, and 10.5% had someone living alone who was 65 years of age or older.  The average household size was 2.89 and the average family size was 3.27.

In the town, the population was spread out, with 38.9% under the age of 18, 6.5% from 18 to 24, 22.9% from 25 to 44, 21.8% from 45 to 64, and 9.8% who were 65 years of age or older.  The median age was 29 years. For every 100 females, there were 91.0 males.  For every 100 females age 18 and over, there were 71.4 males.

The median income for a household in the town was $16,806, and the median income for a family was $18,333. Males had a median income of $27,813 versus $17,188 for females. The per capita income for the town was $8,727.  About 29.5% of families and 40.5% of the population were below the poverty line, including 53.3% of those under the age of eighteen and 37.9% of those 65 or over.

References

Towns in Desha County, Arkansas
Towns in Arkansas